Hydesburg is an extinct town in Ralls County, in the U.S. state of Missouri.

A post office called Hydesburgh was in operation from 1832 until 1871. The community has the name of one Mr. Hyde, a pioneer settler.

References

Ghost towns in Missouri
Former populated places in Ralls County, Missouri